Small Prespa Lake (Limni Mikri Prespa; ; , Malo Prespansko Ezero) is a lake shared between Greece (138 km² drainage area; 42.5 km² surface area) and Albania (51 km² drainage area; 4.3 km² surface area). It is the smaller of the two Prespa Lakes.

Details
Small Prespa Lake in particular has been recognized as an important wetland ecosystems favoring breeding and feeding of rare water bird species. It is best known for hosting the largest breeding colony of the Dalmatian pelican in the world. The flora in the region is composed of more than 1,500 plant species of which 146 endemic species in the Lake Ohrid and 39 endemic species from the Prespa Lakes.

The villages of Rakickë, Shyec, Buzliqen and Tren surround the Albanian portion of the lake. In Greece the villages surrounding the lake are Agios Germanos, Laimos, Milionas, Platy, Kallithea, Lefkonas, Prespes, Karyes, Mikrolimni, Oxia, Pyli and Vrontero.

During 1970 significant amounts of water from the Devoll river was diverted into the lake with the intention to use it latter during the summer time for the irrigation purposes. Due to the high suspended solids in the river water significant siltation did occur on the Albanian side. The practice has recently stopped. The Albanian part of this lake has a surface of 420 hectares. In 1999 the Society for the Protection of Prespa received the Ramsar Wetland Conservation Award for its conservation efforts regarding the Lake Prespa Ramsar site.

Agios Achilleios
Small Prespa Lake contains the island of Agios Achilleios (Saint Achilleus); in February 1948, in the midst of the Greek Civil War, Nikos Zachariadis, the General Secretary of the Communist Party of Greece, married Roula Koukoulou, his long-time lover, on this island, in a widely publicized ceremony.

Located on the island of Agios Achilleios is also the Basilica of Saint Achillius of Larissa. It is an example of the survival of Early Christian architectural style in the Byzantine period. Agios Achilleios was also an early capital of Bulgarian ruler Samuel in the 10th century. The island became a tourist and fishing centre in the 1970s.

Gallery

See also
 Prespa National Park
 Prespa Lake

References

Sources
 http://www.ekby.gr/ekby/en/alwet_web/alwet_site/en/alwet_aims_Prespa_en.html

External links

 Transboundary Prespa Park

Prespa
Prespa Small
National parks of Greece
Prespa Small
Protected areas established in 2000
Landforms of Western Macedonia
Landforms of Thessaly
Tourist attractions in Western Macedonia
Geography of Korçë County
Burial sites of the Cometopuli dynasty
Ramsar sites in Albania
Ramsar sites in Greece
Prespa National Park (Albania)